Mauler or Maulers may refer to:

Military 
Martin AM Mauler, a US Navy attack aircraft introduced in 1948
MIM-46 Mauler, a US Army self-propelled anti-aircraft missile system that suffered development problems and was canceled in 1965
VS-32, a former US Navy anti-submarine squadron nicknamed the "Maulers"

Sports 
Pittsburgh Maulers, a United States Football League team that competed in the 1984 season before folding
Missoula Maulers, a junior ice hockey team in the Western States Hockey League, from Missoula, Montana
Maulers (slamball), a slamball team formerly known as the Steal
Montgomery Maulers, original name of the Montgomery Bears, a defunct American Indoor Football Association team from Montgomery, Alabama
The Mauler, nickname of Alexander Gustafsson (born 1987), Swedish mixed martial artist

Other uses 
Maulers, Oise, a commune in France
Mauler (comics), two Marvel Comics characters

See also
The Manassa Mauler, nickname of Jack Dempsey (1895–1983), American heavyweight boxing champion
The Missouri Mauler (1931–1996), ring name of wrestler Larry "Rocky" Hamilton
Maul (disambiguation)